Gary 'Gazzo' Osbourne (born 1960) is a British street magician. An expert in cons and scams, he moved to the US in the 1980s, where he befriended Walter Irving Scott, also known as The Phantom. He is Scott's only pupil and the only person with whom Scott entrusted his biography and life's work at card cheating and sleights.

Early life

Born in 1960 in Wallingford, his interest in magic was sparked by a Christmas gift from his aunt. At age 10 he also received a copy of 'The Phantom of the Card Table' manuscript by Walter Irving Scott and Eddie McGuire, from his grandfather. The skill of Walter Irving Scott, "The Phantom, The Phantom, intrigued the young magician and influenced his development. He focused on scams and swindles, associating with a team of monte men until, in the late 1970s, he moved to London.

Street magic
In London Osborne took to street performance on the weekends at Covent Garden. His show was a mixture of magic and comedy. At the Magic Circle headquarters in London he practiced his sleight of hand card work, among some of the top performers in the country, from what he could gather from Scott's manuscript. While he was obsessed with false dealing, and Scott's work, Osbourne began to notice that no one else appreciated or was aware of Scott's work. The few that did believe the wild stories of 'The Phantom's' skills also believed he was still alive, fifty years after his famous demonstration in New York City in 1930, and this was the incentive Osborne needed to search him out.

America
Osborne arrived in New York City during 1983. Short of money he relied on the kindness of other street performers, or their friends, to have a place to stay. He also had to tailor his style of comedy to the American audiences in order to start making money from his street magic shows again.

He continued to practice his card work and demonstrated his skills to local New York magicians. His reputation quickly and he soon found himself performing for the elite of New York's Inner Circle.

He was praised by the likes of Harry Lorayne and gambling expert Tony Giorgio.

Eventually Osborne began touring the States, and moved to Key West where he continued performing his street magic to greater success. He continued his traveling and in Boston acquired the new name 'Gazzo Macée'. This is where he met his first wife, Linda Ochwat. They were married and shared a brief time together. Gazzo's idea of marriage was not what he expected. He abruptly dropped Linda off at her relatives, said he would be off for a quick show, but never returned. Without any warning to her and no explanation afterwards, he began his new life.

His version of the classic cups and balls routine, in which he produced a full melon, got him an invitation by the American Association of Magicians to perform at one of their conferences. It was there he met Ray Goulet, a man who had seen 'The Phantom' decades earlier.

After finding no luck in obtaining information about Scott, his original quest to America had virtually been forgotten. When Gazzo visited Goulet at his Museum of Magic in Watertown, Massachusetts, he was shocked to discover that Goulet knew that Scott was still alive. He also knew where he lived. Goulet gave Gazzo a business card for 'Walter Scott and his magic' bearing an address in Massachusetts and a phone number.

Chance meeting

The day after receiving the card, Gazzo called the number and nervously arranged a meeting with Walter Scott for the next day. It was sharp and to the point and Gazzo didn't have the courage to ask any questions about cardsharps, cheating or Scott's 'work'. However, he was thrilled to be so close to his goal.

Scott greeted him warmly, making tea and talking about Gazzo's trip from England. He then produced a musical instrument and ask Gazzo to play so he could see how good he was. Gazzo sat dumbfounded. Apparently there had been a misunderstanding. Scott had expected a student of music looking for lessons. Looking at his business card again Gazzo realised it said 'Music' and not "magic". There was no hint of magic, cards or old evidence to suggest Scott was ever a cardman. He was at least 80 years old and wore glasses.

Devastated Gazzo admitted his mistake at asking for 'lessons', and in an attempt to explain he removed his 1976 edition of The Phantom at the Card Table from his bag. As he left the room to get some more tea Gazzo heard "That book should never have been written".

With that, the truth was clear and the conversation continued. Scott resented McGuire writing that book and spent the next few hours opening up to Gazzo. They talked about his time in New York and about Cardini, McGuire, Max Holden and Dai Vernon. As Gazzo prepared to leave he asked to have his manuscript signed. Scott said he had a ruby that Gazzo could have. Gazzo just wanted the signature. "You're learning fast kid" was Scott's reply.

New generation
Many more meetings followed and Scott gave his side of the story. He talked about cheating, scams, that night in New York, Vernon and McGuire. He revealed his life story and how he eventually had to give up his young hedonistic lifestyle. He also began teaching Gazzo all the 'work' he had used all those years before. Gazzo became known as Scott's pupil and was his emissary in the magic community, relating the stories of New York and the perfect deals.

He was baffling magicians everywhere he went with his refined, Scott-approved dealing skills. Gazzo now intended to write a book and share Scott's story, skills and advice.

Progress was slow, however. Gazzo had married Kristin and had a child named Chaney. Added to this was Scott's age, his memory fading as the years passed more and more.

Legacy
In summer 1994 Gazzo suffered a mild stroke in the middle of a street show. He was taken to a hospital and diagnosed. He was without medical insurance, and was discharged with a bill of $30,000.

Unable to work due to his illness, he was buoyed by his street performer friends who raised almost $20,000 to help him out. Although he began to physically recover he was starting to suffer from depression. This was a combination of not being able to work and that the stroke had affected his motor skills to the point he could no longer do Scott's 'work'.

His recovery was the result of Kristin's support and his own strength and sense of humour. It took almost two years and was not helped when Gazzo heard the news that Walter Scott had died, 12 May 1995.

Despite never recovering full use of his left hand he returned to magic, and worked on making people laugh at the show.

In 2001, aware that he was still the torchbearer for the Phantom legend, he resumed work on his book. He contacted David Britland and in 2002 they published Phantoms of the Card Table; Confessions of a Card Sharp. This book told Scott's entire story, and detailed his eventful demonstration in 1930. It detailed the special card work that Scott had perfected decades earlier and introduced the level of skill and practice necessary to survive as a cardsharp to an entire new generation.

Gazzo is now living in Bath, England, and continues to give lectures and performances around the world and perform street magic. He has published several magic related books, manuscripts and DVDs.
He also produces custom made magic items.

Appearances
Gazzo appeared on the seventh episode of Penn & Teller: Fool Us, where he attempted to outfox Penn & Teller to win an opportunity to open their show in Las Vegas by doing his rendition of cups and balls. Though the duo knew how the trick was done, they praised Gazzo for his rendition of the trick, stating that he did it "perfectly" and "better than us".

References

1960 births
Living people
British magicians